The Volvo FM is a heavy truck range produced by the Swedish company Volvo Trucks. It was originally introduced as FM7, FM10 and FM12 in 1998. FM stands for Forward control Medium height cab, where the numbers denominate an engine capacity in litres. As of 2005 the engine size is no longer added to the model denomination. The FM range is a multipurpose truck range for
distribution, construction and on highway/off highway transport duties. In 2013, Volvo Trucks announced an updated, Euro VI version of the Volvo FM.

Introduction
The FM introduction continued to build on successful line of F7, FL7 and FL10 trucks and it was also a part of Volvo Trucks Corporation  planning strategy  for  "The Global Family Of Trucks" where FM would be  complementing  FH  and  NH/VN  truck range.  Released in conjunction with face-lifted FH range the FM7,10,12 included Volvo electronic architecture and upgraded D12 engine whilst carrying over the older D7 and D10 engines which traced their origins to the early push-rods TD70 and TD100  power plants but with modern electronic controls implants to increase power outputs and improve fuel efficiency and emissions.

Design and technology
The FM range is closely related to the FH range where models share the numbers of components further decreasing production and development costs while improving built efficiency and quality of the products. In principle the FM and the FH and to a degree the NH cabs have a same layout with driver and passenger area, dashboard and seats as the common feature. The lower position of FM cabs is the primary difference between the FM and FH ranges.

First generation (1998–2001)

Cabs
What appeared to be scaled down FH cabs were initially available in three basic sizes, short day cab, sleeper cab, and globetrotter cab.
Various trims and color option were available. Electric cab tilt  was  an option.

Electric and electronics
The electrical and electronic system shared  with the FH series was based on electronic control units and data bus technology. The communication among the different control units run via two data links SAE J1939 and SAE J1708 allowed possibility of diagnostics, analysis and follow up of the vehicle's system via instrument cluster display.

Engines
D7A -> 203
D7C -> 250-290 hp
D10B -> 320-360 hp
D12C -> 380-420 hp
D7C is a further development of D7 generation of engines however major difference between  the latter is the increase of engine capacity from 6.7 litres to 7.3 litres thanks to increase in stroke and cylinder diameter.  Engine management EDC also received the upgrade to bring it inline with the rest of the "family" and be  TEA 98  compliant. Introduction of D12C engine had created all new beast in its class thanks to its extra power and powerful engine brake which were only available previously in the FH class saw operators with an option of smaller cab but still capable long haul unit particularly with globetrotter cab and indeed FM12 did steal some sales from its bigger brother the FH12.

Driveline
The FM7, FM10 and FM12 were available in variety of configurations with manual and automatic transmissions as 4x2 and 6x4 tractor and rigid,  8x2 and 8x4 rigid  and 6x6  special construction models  with hub reductions or single final drives.

Second generation (2001–2020)
In 2001 FM series underwent major revision in conjunction with  FH series. Among changes resulted were 7- and 10-litre engines being dropped and replaced by an all-new 9-litre D9A engine and introduction of a new automated gear-change transmission I-Shift and new passive safety feature FUPS Front Underrun Protection System, designed to prevent smaller vehicles  from being "under run" or wedged under front of the truck in an event of frontal collision.

Engine and transmission
The new D9A engine developed on the basis of D12 with single overhead camshaft and four valves per cylinder and electronic unit injectors followed with a new design feature for Volvo, timing gears at the flywheel side (rear) of the engine, design which will later become standard across entire Volvo truck engine range. D9A power output varies from 300 -  and torque 1400 - 1700 Nm respectively. Introduction of I-Shift also spelled end for Geartronic (AGS) and its shortcomings however the I-Shift was designed to be what it is from ground up where Geartronic was an add on modification to existing manual transmission. In 2003 FM12 with  D12D was launched as well as new version of Powertronic automatic transmission.

2005 upgrade

The evolution of Volvo FM series continued in 2005  with the release of a new generation of FM trucks powered by an all-new 13-litre D13A engine and improved 9-litre D9B unit and the second-generation I-Shift transmission. The naming of the series had also changed: engine size in litres is no longer used in the FM name. The new engines were available in Euro IV emissions standard in both Selective Catalytic Reduction. Volvo had also introduced on D13A engine with SCR an improved version of its engine compression brake the "VEB+" featuring additional helper rocker arm and fourth cam lobe per cylinder. In 2007 Volvo introduced D13B  with Exhaust Gas Recirculation configuration and VGT turbocharger but without exhaust particle filter and is the only manufacturer to offer this solution thus far.

Facelifts

In 2010, Volvo released the completely facelifted FM. The facelift which adds the new styling and added engines. It was the first time fitted with LED daytime running lights. Also, Volvo launched its related to the FM, the FMX.

The facelift version based on the FM was unveiled on 19 March 2013, and made its first public appearance was in April at the 2013 Commercial Vehicle Show in the UK. It also comes standard with the Volvo Dynamic Steering System. It features a choice of two headlights (a halogen HID and a projector HID) both borrowed from the current generation FH. It also adopts a refreshed grille, and the redesigned dashboard with a choice of two digital dials and two analogue gauges, as well as a new steering wheel and an infotainment system. It is available with a choice of carry-over engines with Euro-VI. Sales began in September 2013. As of 2020, the previous facelift model continues to be offered in selected markets when the third generation FM unveiled, now marketed as Volvo FM Classic.

Third generation (2020–present)
The third generation FM which made its debut on 27 February 2020. It is the first new models launched under the brand's recently President Roger Alm. It is available in each configuration, including a Globetrotter high roof version.

The third generation FM features a new LED headlights, combined with halogen and projector units borrowed from the refreshed FH. It also retains a new generation steering wheel, a fully-digital instrument cluster, and a large touchscreen infotainment system.

The third generation FM finally began sales later in 2020.

Marketing
In November 2013, Volvo released the "Epic Split" viral advertisement on YouTube to promote the FM's dynamic steering system. In the video, Jean-Claude Van Damme performs his splits while standing on the side mirrors of two FMs running in reverse.

References

FM
Vehicles introduced in 1998